The Baitul-Jame Mosque in Offenbach am Main is one of Germany's largest mosques, situated on Boschweg in Offenbach am Main.

The mosque was designed by Mubashra Ilyas and is maintained by the Ahmadiyya Muslim Community.

Ahmadiyya mosques in Germany
Buildings and structures in Offenbach am Main